Sleeping on a Roller Coaster is an EP by Tommy Keene, released on CD in 1992 by Matador Records (catalog # OLE 039). This was his only release of new material between 1989's Based on Happy Times and 1996's Ten Years After.

Track listing
All songs written by Tommy Keene
"Love Is a Dangerous Thing" – 3:56
"Driving into the Sun" – 3:29
"Down, Down, Down" – 3:58
"Alive" – 4:17
"Waiting to Fly" – 5:13

Personnel

The band
Tommy Keene — Vocals, guitar, keyboards
Brad Quinn — Bass guitar, back-up vocals, piano
John Richardson — Drums
Justin Hibbard — Guitar ("Driving into the Sun", "Waiting to Fly")

Production
Tommy Keene — Producer
Steve Carr — Producer, engineer
John Hampton — Mixing

Additional credits
Recorded at Hit and Run, Rockville, Maryland
Mixed at Ardent, Memphis, Tennessee ("Love Is a Dangerous Thing", "Driving into the Sun", "Down, Down, Down", "Alive")
Mixed at Hit and Run ("Waiting to Fly")
Edward Glendinning — Photography
Larry Zempel — Art direction and design
Ed Morgan — Manager
"Thanks to Ed, Cheetie, Bobby, Gerard, Chris, John H, Gary S, Josh, Eric P, Ed G, Larry Z, Seth & 9:30 Club, Steve, Joanna, Mark K, Mike, Rick, Ricky, Bo, and Doo-Ron."

1992 EPs
Tommy Keene albums